Carales is a genus of moths in the family Erebidae. The genus was erected by Francis Walker in 1855.

Species
Carales astur (Cramer, [1777])
Carales arizonensis (Rothschild, 1909)
Carales maculicollis Walker, 1855

References

Phaegopterina
Moth genera